The Cajari River is a river in Amazon River delta in the state of Pará, Brazil.

Course

The Cajari River is in the northeast of the island of Marajó in the delta region where the Amazon and Tocantins rivers empty into the Atlantic Ocean.
It is contained within the Marajó Archipelago Environmental Protection Area, a  sustainable use conservation unit created in 1989 to protect the Marajó island and surrounding islands.
The river runs to the east of the  Charapucu State Park into the Baía do Vieira Grande, one of the mouths of the Amazon.
The Furo Charapucu channel runs to the south of the park, connecting the Cajari River to another part of the Vieira Grande Bay.

See also
List of rivers of Pará

References

Sources

Rivers of Pará
Tributaries of the Amazon River